AliExpress is an online retail service based in China and owned by the Alibaba Group. Launched in 2010, it is made up of small businesses in China and other locations, such as Singapore, that offer products to international online buyers. It is the most visited e-commerce website in Russia and was the 10th most popular website in Brazil. It facilitates small businesses to sell to customers all over the world. AliExpress has drawn comparison to eBay, as sellers are independent and use the platform to offer products to buyers.

Business model 
AliExpress started as a business-to-business buying and selling portal. It has since expanded to include business-to-consumer, consumer-to-consumer, cloud computing and payment services. As of 2016 AliExpress ran websites in English, Spanish, Dutch, French, Italian, German, Polish, Turkish, Portuguese, Indonesian and Russian languages - English being the default offered to those countries with languages outside the preceding list. AliExpress is often used by e-commerce stores that use a dropship business model.

Sellers on AliExpress can be either companies or individuals. AliExpress is different from Amazon because it acts only as an e-commerce platform and does not itself sell products directly to consumers. It directly connects Chinese businesses with buyers.

Although most of the retailers are Chinese, AliExpress is aimed at international import buyers and does not sell to customers in mainland China. Customers in China use fellow Alibaba-subsidiary Taobao, because of its convenience in delivery and service, especially the payment method, Alipay. The site offers a popular affiliate marketing program where partners are rewarded with a commission on sales for sending visitors to the site.

Controversies and reviews

In November 2020, India's Ministry of Electronics and Information Technology banned the AliExpress mobile phone app and 42 other apps from China.

In 2022, the Office of the United States Trade Representative added AliExpress to its list of Notorious Markets for Counterfeiting and Piracy.

AliExpress is not accredited by the  Better Business Bureau Review which (as of September 3, 2022) lists 240 complaints about the  e-commerce platform.  In review ratings (with 5.0  being the highest), review aggregator  Trustpilot.com gives a 2.7  rating for AliExpress out of  127,882 reviews,  with "invited" reviews tending to be the more positive. Another review source,  Resellerratings.com, provides 1.00 score for  AliExpress based upon 7,562 reviews. Reviews.io  provides a  low 1.5 rating (out of 5) for  Aliexpress based upon 2,185 Reviews.  Likewise  Aliexpress receives a 1.4 rating from Productreview.com.au based upon 935 reviews,  AliExpress is rated at 37% by MouthShut.com based  upon 5,089 votes.

References

External links 
 

Alibaba Group
Retail companies established in 2010
Internet properties established in 2010
Online retailers of China
2010 establishments in China
Notorious markets